

Latticework is an openwork framework consisting of a criss-crossed pattern of strips of building material, typically wood or metal. The design is created by crossing the strips to form a grid or weave. 
Latticework may be functional – for example, to allow airflow to or through an area; structural, as a truss in a lattice girder;
used to add privacy, as through a lattice screen; purely decorative; or some combination of these.

Latticework in stone or wood from the classical period is also called Roman lattice or transenna (plural transenne).

In India, the house of a rich or noble person may be built with a baramdah or verandah surrounding every level leading to the living area. The upper floors often have balconies overlooking the street that are shielded by latticed screens carved in stone called jalis which keep the area cool and give privacy.

Examples

See also
 Brise soleil
 Jali
 Lattice tower
 Lattice truss bridge
 Lattice stool
 Mashrabiya
 Mesh
 Pergola
 Reticulum
 Tessellation
 Trellis (architecture)
 Truss
 Wattle (construction)
 Yurt

Notes

External links

Architectural elements
Garden features
Gardening aids
Construction